Mark Wellings Priest (born 12 August 1961) is a former New Zealand international cricketer who played in three Test matches and 18 One Day Internationals (ODIs) between 1990 and 1998. He was the leading wicket-taker for Canterbury, with 290 dismissals, until Todd Astle went past his total in February 2019.

Priest was born at Greymouth, West Coast.

Personal life and family
His nephew, Henry Shipley, has also played cricket for Canterbury and New Zealand.

References

External links

1961 births
Living people
New Zealand Test cricketers
New Zealand One Day International cricketers
New Zealand cricketers
Canterbury cricketers
Cricketers from Greymouth
South Island cricketers